Dragan Mikerević (Serbian Cyrillic: Драган Микеревић; born 12 February 1955) is a Bosnian Serb politician.

He served as the 8th Prime Minister of Republika Srpska from 17 January 2003 until 17 February 2005. He announced his resignation in December 2004 after conflicts with the High Representative for Bosnia and Herzegovina.

Previously, he served as the 5th Chairman of the Council of Ministers of Bosnia and Herzegovina from 15 March 2002 until 23 December 2002, when a new government led by Adnan Terzić was formed after the 2002 Bosnian general election. Mikerević was also Minister for European Integration.

He was a member of the Party of Democratic Progress from 1999 until 2009.

References

1955 births
Living people
Serbs of Bosnia and Herzegovina
Party of Democratic Progress politicians
Prime Ministers of Bosnia and Herzegovina
Prime ministers of Republika Srpska